The Garrod Lecture and Medal is an award presented by the British Society for Antimicrobial Chemotherapy. It was established in 1982 and named for L. P. Garrod. The medal is made of silver by the Birmingham Mint. The recipient of the award is considered by the society as having international authority in the field of antimicrobial chemotherapy. They are invited to deliver an accompanying lecture and receive honorary membership of the Society.

Recipients

References

British lecture series
Lists of physicians
Medicine awards
Medical education in the United Kingdom
Medical lecture series